Trine Bjerke Rønning (born 14 June 1982) is a former Norwegian footballer. She has previously played for Trondheims-Ørn and Kolbotn. Since making her Norway women's national football team debut in October 1999, she has won over 150 caps. Rønning represented her country at the 2005, 2009 and 2013 editions of the UEFA Women's Championship, after being a non-playing squad member in 2001. She also played at the 2003, 2007, 2011 and 2015 FIFA Women's World Cups, as well as at the 2008 Olympic football tournament. In February 2015 she was appointed captain of the national team.

Club career
Rønning has won the Norwegian elite Toppserien league six times with three different clubs. First with Trondheims-Ørn SK in 2000 and in 2001, then with Kolbotn in 2005 and in 2006 and again with Stabæk FK in 2010 and 2013. She won the national Norwegian Women's Cup in 1998 (as a 16-year-old), 1999, 2001 and 2002 with Trondheims-Ørn, as the captain of Kolbotn in 2007 and with Stabæk in 2011, 2012 and 2013. In five seasons with Trondheims-Ørn, Rønning scored 40 league goals in 86 appearances. After captaining Kolbotn through the 2007 and 2008 seasons Rønning declined a contract extension and joined the newly formed team Stabæk FK in early 2009. After the 2017 season Rønning decided to retire.

International career
Rønning made her debut on the Norway women's national football team in October 1999, a 4–0 win over Portugal. In 2001 with Norway's youth team she won silver in second place in the UEFA Women's Under-19 Championship. In her early appearances with the national team Rønning played in nearly every position except goalkeeper. She eventually found a settled place in the team at centre back.

She played for the Norway team that won silver at the UEFA Women's Euro 2005 in England, and finished fourth at the 2007 FIFA Women's World Cup in China. Norway also reached the quarter-finals of the Beijing Olympics in 2008 with Rønning as a leading member of the squad. On 4 September 2009 Rønning overcame a knee injury to play her 100th game for Norway in their 3–1 quarter-final win over arch-rivals Sweden in the UEFA Women's Euro 2009. In the same year she became vice captain.

Veteran national coach Even Pellerud selected Rønning in Norway's squad for UEFA Women's Euro 2013 in Sweden. In the final at Friends Arena, she had a first-half penalty kick saved by Germany's goalkeeper Nadine Angerer. Anja Mittag's goal gave the Germans their sixth successive title.

In February 2015 Rønning was named national team captain, as a replacement for the injured Ingvild Stensland. She scored the team's first goal at the 2015 FIFA Women's World Cup, a free-kick in Norway's 4–0 win over Thailand.

Personal life
Rønning's brother Thomas Rønning is also a footballer who formerly played for Bodø/Glimt in the Tippeligaen. In January 2009, Rønning married national team-mate Kristin Blystad-Bjerke, shortly after same-sex marriage in Norway was made legal.

Career statistics
Statistics accurate as of match played 4 November 2017

International goals

References

External links

 
 Profile at Football Association of Norway (NFF) 
 Profile at Stabæk FK 
 

1982 births
Living people
Footballers from Trondheim
Norway women's international footballers
Norwegian women's footballers
SK Trondheims-Ørn players
Kolbotn Fotball players
Stabæk Fotball Kvinner players
Toppserien players
FIFA Century Club
2003 FIFA Women's World Cup players
2007 FIFA Women's World Cup players
2011 FIFA Women's World Cup players
2015 FIFA Women's World Cup players
Olympic footballers of Norway
Footballers at the 2008 Summer Olympics
Norwegian LGBT sportspeople
Lesbian sportswomen
LGBT association football players
Women's association football defenders